Moulton is a city in Lawrence County, Alabama, and is included in the Decatur Metropolitan Area, as well as the Huntsville-Decatur Combined Statistical Area. Although it incorporated in 1819, along with its rival of Courtland, to compete for the honor of county seat, it did not first appear on the U.S. Census rolls until 1900. As of the 2010 census, the population of the city is 3,471, its record high. The city has been the county seat of Lawrence County since 1820. It has been the largest community in the county since the 1920 U.S. Census.

History

By the time Alabama became a state in 1819, an inn had been erected at the site of what is now Moulton to serve migrants along the various early paths that passed through the area.  Shortly after Alabama achieved statehood, both Moulton and Courtland (to the north) incorporated and competed for the county seat of Lawrence County.  Governor Thomas Bibb awarded the seat to Moulton as the most centrally located of the two within the county.  The city is named for Lieutenant Michael Moulton, a soldier killed while fighting under General Andrew Jackson at the Battle of Horseshoe Bend in 1814.

Geography
Moulton is located at  (34.482307, -87.285621).  The city is concentrated along Alabama State Route 33 southwest of Decatur.  Alabama State Route 24 passes through the northern part of the city, and Alabama State Route 157 passes through its eastern section.  The William B. Bankhead National Forest lies to the southwest of Moulton.

Climate
According to the Köppen climate classification, Moulton has a humid subtropical climate (abbreviated Cfa).

Demographics

2020 census

As of the 2020 United States census, there were 3,398 people, 1,457 households, and 815 families residing in the city.

2010 census
As of the census of 2010, there were 3,471 people, 1,482 households, and 912 families residing in the city. The racial makeup of the city was 78.2% White, 13.1% Black or African American, 4.1% Native American, 0.4% Asian, 0.2% from other races, and 4.1% from two or more races. 1.6% of the population were Hispanic or Latino of any race.

There were 1,482 households, out of which 25.4% had children under the age of 18 living with them, 43.7% were married couples living together, 14.0% had a female householder with no husband present, and 38.5% were non-families. 36.1% of all households were made up of individuals, and 18.1% had someone living alone who was 65 years of age or older. The average household size was 2.19 and the average family size was 2.84.

In the city, the population was spread out, with 20.7% under the age of 18, 7.6% from 18 to 24, 26.7% from 25 to 44, 23.1% from 45 to 64, and 21.8% who were 65 years of age or older. The median age was 41 years. For every 100 females, there were 81.7 males. For every 100 females age 18 and over, there were 77.2 males.

The median income for a household in the city was $32,639, and the median income for a family was $49,243. Males had a median income of $52,279 versus $30,000 for females. The per capita income for the city was $20,696. About 8.3% of families and 15.8% of the population were below the poverty line, including 23.9% of those under age 18 and 15.2% of those age 65 or over.

Media
Moulton is home to one radio station, WALW-LP (97.9 FM)

The county's only newspaper, The Moulton Advertiser, resides in Moulton.

Transportation

State highways

Notable people
 Edward B. Almon, U.S. Representative representing Alabama's 8th congressional district from 1915 to 1933.
 Lucas Black, actor, notably in Friday Night Lights and Fast and the Furious: Tokyo Drift
 Mary Lee Cagle, one of the first influential women and pastors in the Church of the Nazarene
 Kimberley Conrad (born 1963), American model and actress, former Playboy playmate (January 1988) and Playmate of the Year (1989)
 Asa Hodges, U.S. representative from Arkansas.
 John Wallace Jones, Mayor of Shreveport, Louisiana from 1854 to 1858.
 Thomas Minott Peters, lawyer and botanist
 Phillip Roddey, brigadier general in the army of the Confederate States of America during the American Civil War
 David Stewart, American football offensive tackle; graduated from Lawrence County High School.

References

External links
 

Cities in Alabama
Cities in Lawrence County, Alabama
Decatur metropolitan area, Alabama
Huntsville-Decatur, AL Combined Statistical Area
County seats in Alabama